The 1985 World Taekwondo Championships were the 7th edition of the World Taekwondo Championships, and were held in Seoul, South Korea, from September 4 to September 8, 1985.  There were a total of 63 participating nations and 280 contestants, all male.  Women were not invited to compete in the world championships until 1987.

Medal summary

Medal table

References
WTF Medal Winners

External links
WT Official Website

World Championships
Taekwondo Championships
World Taekwondo Championships
Sport in Seoul
Taekwondo competitions in South Korea